The North Thompson River is the northern branch of the Thompson River, the largest tributary of the Fraser River, in the Canadian province of British Columbia. It originates at the toe of the Thompson Glacier in the Premier Range of the Cariboo Mountains, west of the community of Valemount. The river flows generally south through the Shuswap Highland towards Kamloops where it joins the South Thompson River to form the main stem Thompson River.

For most of its length, the river is paralleled by Highway 5, and the Canadian National Railway (both of which cross the river a couple of times). The North Thompson passes by several small communities, the most notable being Blue River, Clearwater, and Barriere.

Tributaries of the North Thompson River include Canvas Creek, the Albreda River, Thunder River, Mud Creek, Blue River, Mad River, Raft River, Clearwater River, and Barrière River.

The North Thompson's largest tributary is the Clearwater River, which joins at the town of Clearwater. The Clearwater River drains much of Wells Gray Provincial Park.

A notable feature along the North Thompson is Little Hells Gate, a mini-replica of the much larger Hells Gate rapids on the Fraser River. Many river rafting companies offer a variety of trips through the rapids.

See also
 List of tributaries of the Fraser River

References

External links

Thompson Country
Rivers of British Columbia
Tributaries of the Fraser River
Kamloops Division Yale Land District